Dominik Kubera (born 15 April 1999) is an international speedway rider from Poland.

Speedway career 
Kubera won a bronze and silver medal at the World Under 21 Championship in 2019 and 2020 respectively.  He had previously won the 2018 Individual Speedway Junior European Championship.

During the 2021 Speedway Grand Prix he won silver and bronze medals in the 5th and 6th rounds of the World Championship. In 2022, he helped Lublin win the 2022 Ekstraliga.

References 

Living people
1999 births
Polish speedway riders